John Aloysius Paton (2 April 1923 – 2 October 2015) was a Scottish professional football player, manager, coach, scout and later a professional snooker referee. He began his career in Scotland with Celtic and played in the Football League for Chelsea, Brentford and Watford. Paton later managed Watford and Arsenal 'A'.

Club career

Celtic
Born in Glasgow, Paton joined Celtic (the club he supported as a boy) during the Second World War in May 1942. An outside left, he made his debut in a 2–0 Southern League win over St Mirren on 16 January 1943.

During the war, Paton spent a period as a guest at American Soccer League club New York Americans while stationed in the United States and later guested for Leeds United in 1945 in England, making four appearances. He also guested for Arsenal, Crystal Palace, Millwall and Manchester City during the conflict. Paton scored for Celtic in the Victory in Europe Cup triumph over Queens Park on 9 May 1945.

Due to the suspension of competitive football for the duration of the Second World War, Paton didn't make his first professional appearances for Celtic until the 1947–48 season. He made 77 appearances and scored 16 goals before a dispute with the club's management over wages led to his departure from Celtic Park in September 1949. His last competitive game was the 3–1 1949 Glasgow Cup Final victory over Third Lanark. During the three post-war seasons with Celtic, Paton made 77 appearances and scored 16 goals.

Chelsea (loan)
Paton joined English First Division club Chelsea on loan in November 1946. He made 23 appearances and scored three goals before returning to Celtic in May 1947.

Brentford
Paton signed for Second Division club Brentford in September 1949 for a £5,000 fee. He had contacted London Evening Star columnist (and ex-Arsenal defender) Bernard Joy and asked for an advert to be placed in the paper that he was available for transfer. Brentford manager (and former Celtic player) Malcolm McDonald was the first to take up the option on Paton's services. He had a dream start to his career at Griffin Park, scoring on his debut in a 2–0 win over Bradford Park Avenue and scoring again against Blackburn Rovers in the following game.

A knock suffered in a match versus Southampton on 29 October 1949 hampered his progress, with Paton ruing that he had a "gammy leg" for two years, from which he finally recovered after a successful operation at Brentford hospital. He played on at Griffin Park until the end of the 1951–52 season, by which time he had made 94 appearances and scored 16 goals.

Watford
Paton and Brentford teammate Jimmy Bowie joined Third Division South club Watford in July 1952, to help finance the transfer which had seen Tommy Lawton move to the Bees the previous year. He made 91 appearances and scored 17 goals before playing his final match in 1955.

International and representative career
Paton made appearances for Scotland at international level as a schoolboy and a junior. He played for the RAF representative team during the Second World War and appeared alongside Stanley Matthews in the team.

Coaching and scouting career
Paton lamented the standard of football coaching in England in the early 1950s and said "many managers deliberately starved their players of the ball during the week, believing it made them more hungry for it out on the pitch on a Saturday". Paton and Brentford teammates Ron Greenwood and Jimmy Hill enrolled on the first ever FA coaching course at Lilleshall in the early 1950s. One of the instructors was Brentford goalkeeper Ted Gaskell and Paton roomed with Greenwood, Hill and Malcolm Allison. Paton also led the Hertfordshire FA's youth coaching scheme during the 1954–55 season.

In the early 1960s, Paton worked as a scout for Rotherham United, focusing on Glasgow and Scotland. In 1961, Tommy Docherty offered Paton a scouting role and the position of 'A' team manager at First Division club Arsenal. Paton later found out that Ron Greenwood recommended him for the role. He won the 1961–62 Metropolitan League Cup and the 1962–63 Metropolitan League title with the 'A' team. He left the club in 1965.

Managerial career
After serving Watford as its first-ever player-coach, Paton succeeded Len Goulden as manager in October 1955. He had a good start to his reign, but after entering hospital for a cartilage operation on both knees, the team's form drained away in his absence. Paton was relieved of his duties only four months into his reign, after just two wins from 15 Third Division South matches.

Personal life
Paton was born into a family of Celtic supporters, with his grandfather holding a season ticket at Celtic Park and his father spending time on the club's books as a player. In addition to football, Paton also competed as an amateur welterweight boxer and in athletics as a youth. During the Second World War, he served as a navigator in the RAF. In the late 1950s, Paton turned his back on football and worked as a press photographer, snooker referee and as a sales rep, selling chocolate biscuits. Paton died in October 2015, aged 92.

Honours

As a player
Celtic
 Victory in Europe Cup: 1945
Glasgow Cup: 1948–49

As a manager
Arsenal 'A'
 Metropolitan League: 1962–63
 Metropolitan League Cup: 1961–62

Career statistics

Player

Manager

References

Sources

External links
 ITV interview with Johnny Paton

1923 births
2015 deaths
Scottish football managers
Watford F.C. managers
Watford F.C. players
Chelsea F.C. players
Arsenal F.C. non-playing staff
Celtic F.C. players
Brentford F.C. players
Leeds United F.C. wartime guest players
Rotherham United F.C. non-playing staff
Scotland youth international footballers
Footballers from Glasgow
Scottish footballers
Association football outside forwards
Scottish expatriate footballers
New York Americans (soccer) (1933–1956) players
Scottish expatriate sportspeople in the United States
English Football League players
Scottish Football League players
English Football League managers
Scottish Roman Catholics
Scotland junior international footballers
Royal Air Force personnel of World War II
Scottish Junior Football Association players